Groups of countries or regions are often referred to by a single term (word, phrase, or abbreviation).  The origins of such terms include political alliances, intergovernmental organizations, business market areas, and mere colloquialism.

A 
 AMEA: Asia, Middle East and Africa
 America (AMER or AMERS): Usage varies; it may refer to just the United States of America, or just North America, or all of North and South America combined, or some other combination.
 AMS: Andorra, Monaco, San Marino
 Andean Community  (Spanish: Comunidad Andina or CAN): Free trade area consisting of Bolivia, Colombia, Ecuador, and Peru.
 ANZ: Australia and New Zealand
 ANZIT: Australia-New Zealand-Italy Trilateral relations
 ANZUK: trilateral relations between Australia, New Zealand and the United Kingdom.
 APAC: Asia-Pacific
 Asia-Pacific Economic Cooperation (APEC) is a forum for 21st Pacific Rim member economies that promotes free trade throughout the Asia-Pacific region
 APJ: Asia Pacific and Japan
APMA: Asia Pacific, Middle East and Africa
 APSG: Asia Pacific and Singapore
 African Union (AU) is a continental union consisting of all fifty-five countries on the African continent; See also the African Economic Community (AEC)
 Arab League: a regional organization of Arab countries
 Arraiolos Group is an informal meeting of presidents of parliamentary and semi-presidential European Union member states.
 ASEAN: the Association of Southeast Asian Nations, a regional organisation comprising ten Southeast Asian states
 ASEAN+3: the ASEAN countries, plus China, Japan, and the Republic of Korea (South Korea).
 ASEAN+5: the ASEAN countries with Japan, India, Australia, South Korea and New Zealand. ASEAN+6 along with China.
 Four Asian Tigers: also called "Four Asian Dragons" or "Four Little Dragons", are the economies of Hong Kong, Singapore, South Korea and Taiwan.
 Assembly of European Regions
 Association of Caribbean States
 AUKUS: Australia, the United Kingdom and the United States

B 
Balkan states: Albania, Bosnia and Herzegovina, Bulgaria, Greece, Montenegro, North Macedonia, Serbia, and Turkey; Romania, Slovenia and Croatia are sometimes included.
Baltics, three sovereign states in Northern Europe on the eastern coast of the Baltic Sea: Estonia, Latvia, and Lithuania.
BASIC countries, four large newly industrialized countries, Brazil, South Africa, India, China, to act jointly on climate change and emissions reduction
 Benelux Union is a politico-economic union of three neighbouring states in western Europe: Belgium, the Netherlands, and Luxembourg.
 Big Four (Western Europe) refers to France, Germany, Italy and the United Kingdom. These countries are considered major European powers and they are the Western European countries individually represented as full members of the G7, the G8, the G-10 and the G20. This also has an impact on the Eurovision Song Contest, when these countries added to Spain, are turned the BIG 5.
 BIMSTEC, a group of countries in South Asia and South East Asia around the Bay of Bengal to promote technological and economic co-operation, which includes Bangladesh, Bhutan, India, Myanmar, Nepal, Sri Lanka, and Thailand. 
 BRIC: Brazil, Russia, India, and China, which are all deemed to be at a similar stage of newly advanced economic development
 BRICS: Brazil, Russia, India, China and South Africa
 BSEC, the Organization of the Black Sea Economic Cooperation, is a regional organization focusing on multilateral political and economic initiatives aimed at fostering cooperation in the Black Sea region.
 Bucharest Nine: a group of nine Eastern-European NATO states including Bulgaria, the Czech Republic, Estonia, Hungary, Latvia, Lithuania, Poland, Romania and Slovakia

C 
 CALA: Central America and Latin America, or the Caribbean and Latin America
 CAME: Central Asia and the Middle East
 CANZUK, the current personal union and proposed international organization composed of Canada, Australia, New Zealand, and the United Kingdom.
 CARICOM, Caribbean Community, an organization of fifteen Caribbean nations and dependencies 
 CARIFTA: Caribbean Free Trade Association
 CEFTA, the Central European Free Trade Agreement, current members: Montenegro, Serbia, Albania, Bosnia-Herzegovina, Moldova and North Macedonia
 Celtic Nations: Linguistic and cultural grouping consisting of countries and regions where the Celtic Languages are spoken- Brittany, Cornwall, Ireland (including the Republic of Ireland and Northern Ireland), the Isle of Man, Scotland, and Wales.
CEN-SAD: The Community of Sahel–Saharan States
 Central American Integration System
 CIVETS, six emerging markets countries, Colombia, Indonesia, Vietnam, Egypt, Turkey, and South Africa, a diverse and dynamic economy and a young, growing population
CLMV, Cambodia, Laos, Myanmar and Vietnam in south east Asia, members of ASEAN
 Comecon, formally the Council of Mutual Economic Assistance, consisted of socialist economies within the Communist world: the Soviet Union, Bulgaria, Cuba, Czechoslovakia, East Germany, Hungary, Mongolia, Poland, Romania, and Vietnam. The organization existed from 1949 to 1991 during the Cold War.
 COMESA, the Common Market for Eastern and Southern Africa. 
 Community for Democracy and Rights of Nations, a group of disputed states forging closer political ties. Members include Abkhazia, Artsakh, South Ossetia, and Transnistria.
 Commonwealth of Independent States (CIS), political alliance between the former Soviet Republics of Russia, Armenia, Azerbaijan, Belarus, Moldova, Kazakhstan, Kyrgyzstan, Tajikistan, Turkmenistan, Uzbekistan.
 Commonwealth of Nations, fifty-six member states that are mostly former territories of the British Empire.
 Community of Portuguese Language Countries
 Collective Security Treaty Organization, a military alliance between Russia, Armenia, Belarus, Kazakhstan, Kyrgyzstan, Tajikistan and observer members Serbia and Afghanistan.
 Council of Europe, political alliance of 47 European countries.
 CEE: Central and Eastern Europe
 CUSA: Canada and the United States
 Craiova Group: cooperation project of four European statesRomania, Bulgaria, Greece and Serbiafor the purposes of furthering their European integration as well as economic, transport and energy cooperation with one another.

D 
 Development Assistance Committee (DAC), to discuss issues surrounding aid, development and poverty reduction in developing countries, the world's major donor countries, Australia, European Union, Iceland, New Zealand, South Korea, Austria, Finland, Ireland, Norway, Spain, Belgium, France, Italy, Poland, Sweden, Canada, Germany, Japan, Portugal, Switzerland, Czech Republic, Greece, Luxembourg, Slovakia, United Kingdom, Denmark, Hungary, Netherlands, Slovenia, and United States.
 DACH: Majority German-speaking states of Central Europe (excludes the Principality of Liechtenstein). Utilises the German name of Germany and the Latin names of Austria and Switzerland. Germany (Deutschland), Austria (Austria) and Switzerland (Confoederatio Helvetica), with Dach meaning "roof" in German. The term is sometimes extended to  D-A-CH-Li, DACHL, or DACH+ to include Liechtenstein. Another version is DACHS (with Dachs meaning "badger" in German) with the inclusion of the German-speaking region of South Tyrol in Italy.

E 
 East African Community (EAC) is an intergovernmental organisation composed of six countries in the African Great Lakes region in eastern Africa: Burundi, Kenya, Rwanda, South Sudan, Tanzania, Uganda and the DRC.
 ECCAS: The Economic Community of Central African States.
 ECGLC: The Economic Community of the Great Lakes Countries, consisting of Burundi, the Democratic Republic of the Congo, and Rwanda
 ECOWAS: The Economic Community of West African States, a regional political and economic union of fifteen countries located in West Africa. 
 Eastern Partnership, a group of former soviet republics forging closer economic and political ties with the European Union. Members include Armenia, Azerbaijan, Belarus, Georgia, Moldova, and Ukraine.
 Economic Cooperation Organization (ECO), Afghanistan, Azerbaijan, Iran, Kazakhstan, Kyrgyzstan, Pakistan, Tajikistan, Turkey, Turkmenistan, Uzbekistan, a political and economic organization, a platform to discuss ways to improve development and promote trade and investment opportunities, the objective is to establish a single market for goods and services.
 EEA: The European Economic Area, which contains the European Union countries, plus Norway, Iceland and Liechtenstein
 EAEU: Eurasian Economic Union, an economic union of Belarus, Kazakhstan, Russia, Armenia, Kyrgyzstan and observer members Moldova, Uzbekistan and Cuba.
 EU, The European Union, a political and economic union of 27 member states that are located primarily in Europe.
 EU+EEA+CH: The European Union + the European Economic Area + Switzerland, sign visible very often shown on the Schengen Area airports
 Euronest Parliamentary Assembly: Interparliamentary forum between the EU and Eastern Partnership member states.
 EFTA: European Free Trade Association
 EMEA: Europe, the Middle East and Africa
 EMEAI: Europe, the Middle East, Africa and India
 ENWA: Europe and Northwest Asia

F 
 Five Eyes (FVEY), is an anglophone intelligence alliance comprising Australia, Canada, New Zealand, the United Kingdom and the United States.
 Federation of Euro-Asian Stock Exchanges (FEAS): Cooperation of stock-exchanges from Eastern Europe and West Asia.
 Four Asian Tigers, economies of Hong Kong, Singapore, South Korea, Taiwan, underwent rapid industrialization and maintained exceptionally high growth rates, now developed into advanced and high-income economies.
 FLAME: France-Latin America relationship
 Francamérique: French Overseas region and collectivities in the Americas
 FRES: France and Spain (in Spanish as España)
 FRIT: France and Italy
 FRITES: France, Italy and Spain (in Spanish as España)
 FRITESPOR: France, Italy, Spain and Portugal (in Spanish as España)

G 
 G4 nations: Brazil, Germany, India, and Japan, four countries which support each other's bids for permanent seats on the United Nations Security Council.
 Global Governance Group (G3), a group of 30 small to medium member countries which collectively provides representation and input to the G20.
 Group of Two (G2): United States and China (informal) focusing on Sino-American relations. Per being considered two of the most influential and powerful countries in the world
 EU's G6 - France, Germany, Italy, Poland, Spain, and the United Kingdom - countries with largest populations and thus the majority of votes in the Council of the European Union
Group of Seven (G7): Canada, France, Germany, Italy, Japan, the United Kingdom, the United States, the seven major advanced economies as reported by the International Monetary Fund.
 G8: US, UK, France, Germany, Italy, Canada, Russia, and Japan, the eight major advanced economies as reported by the  IMF, which became the G7 after expelling Russia following the 2014 invasion of Crimea.
 G8+5, the G8 nations, plus the five leading emerging economies (Brazil, China, India, Mexico, and South Africa).
 G20, or Group of Twenty, twenty major economies comprising Argentina, Australia, Brazil, Canada, China, European Union, France, Germany, India, Indonesia, Italy, Japan, South Korea, Mexico, Russia, Saudi Arabia, South Africa, Turkey, United Kingdom, United States, for studying, reviewing, and promoting high-level discussion of policy issues pertaining to the promotion of international financial stability.
 Group of 77 (G77), a loose coalition of developing nations designed to promote its members' collective economic interests and create an enhanced joint negotiating capacity in the United Nations.
 GUAM Organization for Democracy and Economic Development: Georgia, Ukraine, Azerbaijan, and Moldova
 GCC (Gulf Cooperation Council): Bahrain, Kuwait, Oman, Qatar, Saudi Arabia, and the UAE. A regional intergovernmental political and economic union consisting of all Arab states of the Persian Gulf, except for Iraq.
 Greater China: Mainland China, Hong Kong, Macau, and Taiwan
 GAS: Germany, Austria, and Switzerland (uncommon, DACH is more widely used)

I 
 IBSA Dialogue Forum: India, Brazil, South Africa, an international tripartite grouping for promoting international cooperation among these countries.
 IGAD: the Intergovernmental Authority on Development, a trade bloc centered on the Horn of Africa, Nile Valley and African Great Lakes regions.
 IMEA: India, Middle East and Africa
 Inner Six - founding member states of the European Communities.
 International Solar Alliance, the International Solar Alliance (ISA), is an alliance of more than 122 countries initiated by India, and France most of them being sunshine countries, which lie either completely or partly between the Tropic of Cancer and the Tropic of Capricorn.
 Interparliamentary Assembly on Orthodoxy, an inter-parliamentary institution of 21 national parliaments representing Orthodox Christians.
 Indian Ocean Commission (IOC), intergovernmental organisation linking several African Indian Ocean nations
 I2U2 Group also known as West Quad is a grouping of India, Israel, the United Arab Emirates, and the United States who aim to cooperate on "joint investments and new initiatives in water, energy, transportation, space, health, and food security."

L
 La Francophonie: an international organization representing countries and regions where French is a lingua franca or customary language
 LAMEA: Latin America, the Middle East and Africa
 LATAM: Latin America
 LATCAR: Latin America and Caribbean
 Levant: Cyprus, Israel, Jordan, Lebanon, Palestine, Syria
 Lublin Triangle: Poland, Lithuania, Ukraine (Union of Lublin created the Polish–Lithuanian Commonwealth)

M 
 Mercosur (Southern Common Market), a trade bloc of Argentina, Brazil, Paraguay, Uruguay, to promote free trade and the fluid movement of goods, people, and currency.
 MIKTA, an informal partnership between Mexico, Indonesia, Republic of Korea (South Korea), Turkey, Australia, to support effective global governance.
 MINT, the economies of Mexico, Indonesia, Nigeria, and Turkey.
 MART: Middle East, Africa, Russia and Turkey
 MEA: Middle East and Africa
 MEASEA : Middle East, Africa and South East Asia
 MEATI: Middle East, Africa, Turkey & India
 MEESA: Middle East, Eastern and Southern Africa
 MEISA: Middle East, Indian Subcontinent and Africa
 MENA: Middle East and North Africa
 MENACA: Middle East, North Africa, and Central Asia
 MEP: Middle East and Pakistan
 META: Middle East, Turkey and Africa
 MRU: the Mano River Union, consisting of Cote d'Ivoire, Guinea, Liberia and Sierra Leone

N 
NAC: North America and the Caribbean
NAM: Non-Aligned Movement
NATO: North Atlantic Treaty Organization; NATO is formal group country to defend itself against outside aggression. 
 NAFTA: North American Free Trade Agreement, was an agreement signed by Canada, Mexico, and the United States, creating a trilateral trade bloc in North America.
New Hanseatic League: financial grouping of Denmark, Estonia, Finland, Ireland, Latvia, Lithuania, the Netherlands and Sweden
Next Eleven (N11): Bangladesh, Egypt, Indonesia, Iran, Mexico, Nigeria, Pakistan, the Philippines, Turkey, South Korea, and Vietnam – identified as having a high potential of becoming, along with the BRICS countries, among the world's largest economies in the 21st century.
 NACE: North Atlantic and Central Europe
 NALA: North America and Latin America
 NORAM or NA or NAMER: North American Region (Canada, United States, and Mexico)
 Nordics: in addition to the Scandinavian countries Denmark, Norway and Sweden, also Finland and Iceland are included.
 Nordic-Baltic Eight (NB8): the Nordic and Baltic countries: Denmark, Estonia, Finland, Iceland, Latvia, Lithuania, Norway, and Sweden
 NWA: Northwest Asia

O 
 OIC, the Organisation of Islamic Cooperation, is an international organization founded in 1969, consisting of 57 member states, with a collective population of over 1.8 billion as of 2015 with 54 countries being Muslim-majority countries.
 OAS, the Organization of American States, is a continental organization of the 35 independent nations within North, Central and South America
 OECD, the Organisation for Economic Co-operation and Development, to stimulate economic progress and world trade, countries committed to democracy and the market economy, most OECD members are high-income economies with a very high Human Development Index (HDI) and are regarded as developed countries.
 OECS, a group of island nations located in the Eastern Caribbean.
 OIAS, the Organization of Ibero-American States, an organization of Portuguese and  Spanish Speaking Nations of the Americas, Africa, and Europe.
 Organization of Turkic States: an international organization comprising some of the Turkic countries (Turkey, Azerbaijan, Kazakhstan, Uzbekistan, and Kyrgyzstan).
 OPEC, the Organization of the Petroleum Exporting Countries, an organization of thirteen countries accounting for an estimated 42 percent of global oil production and 73 percent of the world's proven oil reserves. (OPEC+: the OPEC countries plus Russia)

P 
 P5, permanent members of the United Nations Security Council: China, France, Russia, the United Kingdom, and the United States.
 Pacific Alliance, a trade bloc of states that border the Pacific Ocean. Permanent members include Chile, Colombia, Mexico, and Peru.
 The Pacific Pumas, a political and economic grouping of countries along Latin America's Pacific coast that includes Chile, Colombia, Mexico and Peru. The term references the four larger Pacific Latin American emerging markets that share common trends of positive growth, stable macroeconomic foundations, improved governance and an openness to global integration.
 PALOP, the Portuguese-speaking African countries, also known as Lusophone Africa that includes: Angola, Cape Verde, Guinea-Bissau, Mozambique, São Tomé and Príncipe and Equatorial Guinea.
 Paris Club, a group of major creditor countries whose officials meet ten times a year in the city of Paris, with the intent to find coordinated and sustainable solutions to the payment difficulties experienced by debtor countries.
 PIGS, also PIIGS, the economies of the countries of Portugal, Greece, Spain, Italy and/or Ireland.
 PROSUR, the Forum for the Progress and Integration of South America.

Q 
 Quadrilateral Security Dialogue also known as QUAD is a strategic security dialogue between Australia, India, Japan, and the United States that is maintained by talks between member countries.

R 
 Rio Group, was an international organization of Latin American and some Caribbean states that was succeeded in 2010 by the Community of Latin American and Caribbean States.
 ROME: Rest of Middle East
 Russosphere (population that speak Russian):  Armenia, Azerbaijan, Belarus, Estonia, Georgia, Kazakhstan, Kyrgyzstan, Latvia, Lithuania, Moldova, Russia, Tajikistan, Turkmenistan, Ukraine, Uzbekistan
 Rzeczpospolita: Polish–Lithuanian Commonwealth: Poland, Lithuania, Belarus, Ukraine

S 
 SAARC, a geopolitical union of nations in South Asia
 SADC: the Southern African Development Community
 SCA: South and Central America
 Scandinavia: Denmark, Norway and Sweden (in some definitions, Finland is included due to strong historical ties to Sweden, and Iceland is sometimes included due to strong historical ties to Denmark and Norway).
 Shanghai Cooperation Organisation (SCO), a Eurasian political, economic, and security organisation comprising: China, Kazakhstan, Kyrgyzstan, Russia, Tajikistan, Uzbekistan, India and Pakistan.
 SaarLorLux: Saarland, Lorraine, Luxembourg
 SEA: South-East Asia
 Southern Cone (Cono Sur): Argentina, Chile, Paraguay, Uruguay and Southern Brazil. 
 South Asia: Afghanistan, Bangladesh, Bhutan, Maldives, Nepal, India, Pakistan and Sri Lanka
 South Atlantic Peace and Cooperation Zone (ZPCAS or ZOPACAS): group of nations along the Atlantic coasts of Sub-Saharan Africa and South America, formed with a special focus on opposing nuclear proliferation in the region
 SSA: Sub-Saharan Africa

T 
 TAKM: Turkey, Azerbaijan, Kyrgyzstan
 The Stans: Afghanistan, Kazakhstan, Kyrgyzstan, Pakistan, Tajikistan, Turkmenistan, Uzbekistan
 Tiger Cub Economies: a grouping of five newly industrialized emerging markets and middle powers in Southeast Asia: Indonesia, Malaysia, Philippines, Thailand, and Vietnam
 Trimarium (Three Seas, Trójmorze): running along a north–south axis from the Baltic Sea to the Adriatic and Black Seas in Central and Eastern Europe- Austria, Bulgaria, Croatia, the Czech Republic, Estonia, Hungary, Latvia, Lithuania, Poland, Romania, Slovakia, and Slovenia

U 
 United Nations (UN), an intergovernmental organization to promote international co-operation, 193 member states.
 Union State, a Supranational union made up of Russia and Belarus.
 UNASUR: Union of South American Nations.

V 
 V4, Visegrád Group, an alliance of four Central European States: the Czech Republic, Hungary, Poland, and Slovakia.
 VISTA (Vietnam, Indonesia, South Africa, Turkey, and Argentina) is an emerging markets grouping proposed in 2006 by BRICs Economic Research Institute of Japan.

W 
 Warsaw Pact (former): Soviet Union, Albania, Bulgaria, Czechoslovakia, East Germany, Hungary, Poland, Romania

See also
 List of military alliances
 List of multilateral free-trade agreements
 United Nations geoscheme

References

Countries
Economic geography
Grouping
Lists of places